Chad Lovejoy (born September 15, 1973) is an American politician who served in the West Virginia House of Delegates from the 17th district from 2016 to 2022.

References

1973 births
Living people
Democratic Party members of the West Virginia House of Delegates
21st-century American politicians